The Presque Isle River runs  through the Upper Peninsula of Michigan and empties into Lake Superior. Along its course, it flows through the Ottawa National Forest and Porcupine Mountains Wilderness State Park.  It has  of drainage area in Upper Michigan and northern Wisconsin.

Several waterfalls are located on the river.  They include (from west to east):

Manabezho Falls
Manido Falls
Nawadaha Falls
Iagoo Falls
Lepisto Falls
Nokomis Falls
Nimikon Falls
Minnewawa Falls
Yondota Falls

References

External links 

Rivers of Michigan
Tributaries of Lake Superior
Rivers of Gogebic County, Michigan
Wild and Scenic Rivers of the United States